The Book of Burning is an album by the American heavy metal band Virgin Steele. It was released in January 2002 by Noise Records to celebrate the twentieth anniversary of the band, together with the compilation Hymns to Victory. The Book of Burning caused a controversy between founding members David DeFeis and Jack Starr about the format of the recording, with the result of Starr renouncing any involvement in the production of the album and in other reunion projects.

According to the CD booklet, the album was recorded from June to August 2001, except "Conjuration of the Watcher", which was recorded in 1999 during "The House Of Atreus Act I" sessions.

This album contains primarily re-arranged and re-recorded songs taken from the first two Virgin Steele albums, published only in vinyl and at the time out of print. Also included are songs written at various points in their career which had never been released. Tracks 3, 5, 7 and 15 are re-recorded versions of songs that were written and demoed by David DeFeis and Jack Starr in 1997.

"Conjuration of the Watcher" and "The Succubus" are two songs originally written in 1986 for the American all-female heavy metal band Original Sin on their debut LP Sin Will Find You Out, which were reworked and recorded by Virgin Steele in different recording sessions.

Track listing

Personnel

Band members 
 David DeFeis - all vocals, keyboards, percussions, guitars, orchestration, effects, producer
 Edward Pursino - acoustic and electric guitars, bass
 Frank Gilchriest - drums

Additional musicians 
 Joshua Block - bass, guitar
 Steve Young - guitar, bass, programming, engineer, mastering
 Frank Zummo - drums
 Jim Hooper - backing vocals

References 

Virgin Steele albums
Noise Records albums